Whiteside Marsh is a coastal estuary marsh and wetlands on the northwestern shore of San Pablo Bay in northern Marin County, California. It is in and adjacent to the city of Novato and the Bel Marin Keys community, in the North Bay region of the San Francisco Bay Area.

Restoration
The marsh is the site of the Hamilton Wetland Restoration Project, a federal and state wetlands habitat restoration project on the closed Hamilton Army Airfield.

It is a habitat of the endangered California red-legged frog, identifiable as the name implies by distinctive red markings on the legs. It is also nesting habitat for the endangered California Least Tern.

History
Around the turn of the 19th century, marshes at the site were diked, dried out, and farmed.  It was the homestead of Peter Whiteside. 

Hamilton Air Force Base was built on the site in 1930. It and the subsequent Hamilton Army Airfield occupied the area until the base was closed in 1988.

See also

References

External links
Hamiltonwetlands.gov: Official Hamilton/Bel Marin Keys Wetlands Restoration Project website — Whiteside Marsh project.

Marshes of California
San Pablo Bay
Estuaries of California
Landforms of Marin County, California
Wetlands of the San Francisco Bay Area
Natural history of Marin County, California
Novato, California
Protected areas of Marin County, California